NATO (North Atlantic Treaty Organization) is an international military alliance that consists of 30 member states from Europe and North America. It was established at the signing of the North Atlantic Treaty on 4 April 1949. Article 5 of the treaty states that if an armed attack occurs against one of the member states, it shall be considered an attack against all members, and other members shall assist the attacked member, with armed forces if necessary. Article 6 of the treaty limits the scope of Article 5 to the islands north of the Tropic of Cancer, the North American and European mainlands, the entirety of Turkey, and French Algeria. As such, an attack on Hawaii, Puerto Rico, French Guiana, Ceuta, or Melilla, among other places, would not trigger an Article 5 response.

Of the 30 member countries, 28 are in Europe and two in North America. Between 1994 and 1997, wider forums for regional cooperation between NATO and its neighbours were set up, including the Partnership for Peace, the Mediterranean Dialogue initiative and the Euro-Atlantic Partnership Council. 

All members have militaries, except for Iceland, which does not have a typical army (but it does have a coast guard and a small unit of civilian specialists for NATO operations). Three of NATO's members are nuclear weapons states: France, the United Kingdom, and the United States. NATO has 12 original founding member states. Three more members joined between 1952 and 1955, and a fourth new member joined in 1982. After the end of the Cold War, NATO added 14 more members from 1999 to 2020.

NATO currently recognizes Bosnia and Herzegovina, Finland, Georgia, Sweden, and Ukraine as aspiring members as part of their Open Doors enlargement policy.

Founding members and enlargement

NATO was established on 4 April 1949 via the signing of the North Atlantic Treaty (Washington Treaty). The 12 founding members of the Alliance were: Belgium, Canada, Denmark, France, Iceland, Italy, Luxembourg, the Netherlands, Norway, Portugal, the United Kingdom, and the United States.

The various allies all sign the Ottawa Agreement, which is a 1951 document that acts to embody civilian oversight of the Alliance.

Current membership consists of 30 countries. In addition to the 12 founding countries, four new members joined during the Cold War: Greece (1952), Turkey (1952), West Germany (1955) and Spain (1982). In 1990, the territory of the former East Germany was added with the reunification of Germany. NATO further expanded after the Cold War, adding the Czech Republic, Hungary and Poland (1999), Bulgaria, Estonia, Latvia, Lithuania, Romania, Slovakia and Slovenia (2004), Albania and Croatia (2009), Montenegro (2017) and North Macedonia (2020). Of the territories and members added between 1990 and 2020, all were either formerly part of the Warsaw Pact (including the formerly Soviet Baltic states) or territories of the former Yugoslavia (which was not a Warsaw Pact member). No countries have left NATO since its founding.

Membership aspirations
, five additional states have formally informed NATO of their membership aspirations: Bosnia and Herzegovina, Finland, Georgia, Sweden and Ukraine.

 NATO members agreed at the 2008 Bucharest Summit that Georgia and Ukraine "will become members of NATO in the future".
 Bosnia and Herzegovina was invited by NATO to join the Membership Action Plan (MAP) in April 2010.
 In May 2022, Finland and Sweden simultaneously submitted official application letters to become NATO members.

List of member countries
The current members and their dates of admission are listed below.

Special arrangements 
The three Nordic countries which joined NATO as founding members, Denmark, Iceland and Norway, chose to limit their participation in three areas: there would be no permanent peacetime bases, no nuclear warheads and no Allied military activity (unless invited) permitted on their territory.  However, Denmark allowed the U.S. Air Force to maintain an existing base, Thule Air Base, in Greenland. 

From the mid-1960s to the mid-1990s, France pursued a military strategy of independence from NATO under a policy dubbed "Gaullo-Mitterrandism". Nicolas Sarkozy negotiated the return of France to the integrated military command and the Defence Planning Committee in 2009, the latter being disbanded the following year. France remains the only NATO member outside the Nuclear Planning Group and unlike the United States and the United Kingdom, will not commit its nuclear-armed submarines to the alliance.

Military personnel

The following list is constructed from The Military Balance, published annually by the International Institute for Strategic Studies.

Military expenditures

The defence spending of the United States is more than double the defence spending of all other NATO members combined. Criticism of the fact that many member states were not contributing their fair share in accordance with the international agreement by then US president Donald Trump caused various reactions from American and European political figures, ranging from ridicule to panic. 

Pew Research Center's 2016 survey among its member states showed that while most countries viewed NATO positively, most NATO members preferred keeping their military spending the same. The response to whether their country should militarily aid another NATO country if it were to get into a serious military conflict with Russia was also mixed. Roughly half or fewer in six of the eight countries surveyed say their country should use military force if Russia attacks a neighboring country that is a NATO ally. And at least half in three of the eight NATO countries say that their government should not use military force in such circumstances. The strongest opposition to responding with armed force is in Germany (58%), followed by France (53%) and Italy (51%). More than half of Americans (56%) and Canadians (53%) are willing to respond to Russian military aggression against a fellow NATO country. A plurality of the British (49%) and Poles (48%) would also live up to their Article 5 commitment. The Spanish are divided on the issue: 48% support it, 47% oppose.

Notes

References
Citations

Bibliography

 

NATO